Furmanov may refer to:
Dmitry Furmanov (1891–1926), Russian/Soviet writer
Rudolf Furmanov (1938-2021), Russian actor and stage director
Furmanov (inhabited locality), name of several inhabited localities in Russia
 Asteroid 6511 Furmanov, named after Rudol'f Davidovich Furmanov (born 1938), a Russian theater artist and producer
 Furmanov, Ivanovo Oblast